Hop House 13 is an Irish lager, produced by Diageo (owners of Guinness).

Background
Hop House 13 is brewed by the Brewers Project, which also manufactures Guinness Dublin Porter, Guinness West Indies Porter and Guinness Golden Ale. The beer is named after a hop store building at St James Gate that existed in the early 20th century. It was influenced by the craft beer industry which had become successful.

Flavour
Hop House 13 is a double-hopped lager brewed with barley, Guinness yeast, Australian Galaxy and Topaz hops, and American Mosaic hops. 

It is described as having a fruity aroma including tastes of apricot and peach, having a full-flavoured taste that is crisp and hoppy without being bitter. It has a golden amber colour with an ivory white head. Hop House 13 is 4.1% alcohol by volume, though it can be 5% in certain markets. In the United Kingdom, it has just been downgraded to 4.6% ABV from 5% ABV.

Distribution

Hop House 13 was first produced in Ireland in 2015. It was launched with an interactive experience show which included a tour of the brewery and tasting workshops. It was a success, and the beer was ordered by numerous publicans immediately after launch. Hop House 13 was subsequently exported to the UK, and then worldwide. A year after being announced, it was available in 1,000 pubs and other licensed premises in the UK, as well as off-trade bottles being shipped in supermarkets. The beer was heavily promoted with a multi-million pound advertising campaign in 2016, including adverts on YouTube and other social media websites.

Partly as a result of strong sales of Hop House 13, sales of Guinness products in Europe increased by 2%. In 2019, Diageo announced the beer would be sold in South Korea.

References

External links
 Official website
 

Beer in Ireland